Montone is a comune (municipality) in the Province of Perugia in the Italian region Umbria, located about 35 km north of Perugia.

Montone is a walled medieval village with a small industrial and housing estate surrounding the walled town  center.  The town is the origin of the Fortebracci condottieri family, whose most famous member was Braccio da Montone.

History 
Constructed during the Middle Ages, Montone arose in the 11th century as a fiefdom of the Colle Margravate and subsequently changed hands to the Del Monte family. It soon afterwards came under control of the independent city-state of Perugia, which granted Montone sovereignty over its own laws and officers in 1121.

The most important ruling dynasty in Montone's history was undoubtedly the Fortebracci. Their presence in the city is first documented near the end of the fourteenth century, and their influence persists to the present day in the form of local customs, street names, and architecture. Andrea "Braccio da Montone" Fortebraccio was the most important Fortebraccio in Montone, having served as Mercenary Captain of a kingdom spanning from Lazio through Umbria all the way to Abruzzo. The presence of such a large independent state in Central Italy was at the time one of the most daring challenges to the regional hegemony of the Papal States. In recognition of his service, the Antipope John XXIII created and awarded to Fortebraccio the title of Count of Montone on August 28, 1414.

The Fortebraccio family's rule over Montone was reified ten years later when the officially-recognized pope, Martin V, extended the counthood to Carlo Fortebraccio following the death of his father Braccio da Montone at the Battle of Aquila. Following in his father's footsteps, Carlo also became a condottiero mercenary. In 1473 he achieved a major victory for the Republic of Venice over the Ottoman Empire, and received an alleged thorn from the Jesus' crown of thorns as a reward. Carlo sent the relic to Montone and decreed Easter Monday in Montone as the Feast of the Thorn. 

Fortebraccio rule persisted in Montone until the early 16th century. In 1519, Pope Leo IX annulled the Fortebraccio counthood and passed it to Vitello Vitelli, a member of the Vitelli family of Città di Castello. The Vitelli ruled over Montone until their family line ended in 1646, after which point Montone was fully annexed into the Papal States.

References

External links
Official website

Cities and towns in Umbria